Jørn Kristensen (born  in Skjern Municipality) is a Danish wheelchair curler.

He participated in the 2006 Winter Paralympics where Danish team finished on fifth place.

Teams

References

External links 

Living people
1957 births
People from Ringkøbing-Skjern Municipality
Danish male curlers
Danish wheelchair curlers
Paralympic wheelchair curlers of Denmark
Wheelchair curlers at the 2006 Winter Paralympics
Sportspeople from the Central Denmark Region